Ecca Vandal is the eponymous debut studio album by Australian rapper Ecca Vandal, released on 20 October 2017 by Dew Process. It was co-produced by Vandal and Kidnot, it also featured extra vocals from Dennis Lyxzén, Jason Aalon Butler, and local talent Sampa the Great.

Promotion
On 28 September 2017, Ecca Vandal announced the release date of her debut album and a 10-date national tour for it going from 3–25 November. Across Australia she performed her album in Fremantle, Adelaide, Newcastle, Sydney, Wollongong, Gold Coast, Coolum, Brisbane, Ballarat, and finished in her hometown of Melbourne. In December, she made her UK tour debut supporting Frank Carter & The Rattlesnakes performing in Bristol, Birmingham, Manchester, Glasgow, Nottingham, Norwich, London. She then returned home to perform at the 2017 Falls Music & Arts Festival in Lorne, Marion Bay, Byron Bay, and Fremantle again.

Writing and composition
All songs were written and co-produced by Vandal and Kidnot, she collaborated with Dennis Lyxzén of Refused, Jason Aalon Butler of Letlive, and local talent Sampa the Great. Her music style portrayed in the album has been described as a mix of rock, hip hop, and pop. It was also described as a punk anthem and incorporating the soul genre into the mix.

Critical reception

The album was well received by critics. On Discogs, which assigns a normalised rating out of 5 to reviews from critics, the album has an average score of 4.67 based on 3 reviews. Thomas Smith of NME praised "Broke Days, Party Nights" for its Beastie Boys-esque sound, and "Price of Living" featuring Dennis Lyxzén and Jason Butler for how the rapper addresses and critiques the current political system. "Future Heroine" and "Closing Ceremony" were praised for having heavy drums, and chunky riffs respectively. "Your Orbit" was "a softer and more melodic side [being] shown", but was by no means lower in quality. "Bad Habit" and "Cold of the World" were compared to the 1990s style of music and rapper M.I.A.

Jonty Cornford summarised the album as "Synth-laden punk anthems with real edge" and recommended it to fans of DZ Deathrays, Art vs. Science, Waax, and Refused.

Track listing
Track listing adapted from Spotify.

Personnel

Ecca Vandal
Ecca Vandal – lead vocals
Unknown – drums
Unknown – guitar

Additional musicians
Dennis Lyxzén – guest vocals on track 3
Jason Aalon Butler – guest vocals on track 3
Sampa the Great – guest vocals on track 7

Production
Ecca Vandal – producer
Kidnot – co-producer, engineer
Hadyn Buxton – mixer
Ryan Smith – mastering engineer

References

Ecca Vandal albums
2017 debut albums
Dew Process albums